Gongsan(-)dang, literally Communist Party may also refer to:

All Russia Communist Party of Korea (1919-1922)
Communist Party of Korea (Sanghai) (1921-1922)
Communist Party of Masan (1924-1925)
Communist Party of Korea (1925-1928, 1945–1946)

See also 
Jinbodang (disambiguation)
Minjudang (disambiguation)
Nodongdang (disambiguation)